Austiniceras is a subgenus of Parapuzosia, the shell of which is commonly large, moderately involute, high whorled, with flat or convex sides that converge on a narrowly rounded venter. Primary ribs are signoid or concave. Constrictions where present are rather shallow. The related subgenus P. (Parapuzosia) differs in having a more oval whorl section, stronger and straighter primary ribs, and a smooth outer whorl.

Parapuzosia (Austiniceras) has a rather long temporal range. It is known from Lower Cenomanian to Upper Turonian sediments in  western Europe and from the Coiniaian to the Campanian of Madagascar, and is recorded from Japan, North Aftrica, and North America (Texas).

References

Kennedy, W.J., Chahida M.R., and Djafarian M.A. Cenomanian cephalopods from the Glauconitic Limestone southeast of Esfahan, Iran. Acta Palaeontoligica Polonica, 24, I, 3-50, April 20, 1979.

Cretaceous ammonites
Ammonites of Europe
Cenomanian first appearances
Turonian extinctions
Animal subgenera
Desmoceratidae